Mitchell Linn Hannahs (born September 16, 1967) in an American college baseball coach, currently serving as head coach of the Indiana State Sycamores baseball program.  He was named to that position prior to the 2014 season.  He previously served as president of Lincoln Trail College.  He also was a member of the 1989 College Baseball All-America Team, selected by the American Baseball Coaches Association.

Playing career
Hannahs was a standout second baseman for the Sycamores, helping them to 172 wins and three NCAA Tournament appearances in his four seasons.  He continues to rank highly in many offensive categories in the all-time Indiana State record book, including sixth in batting average, second in runs, and fourth in hits.  In his senior season, Hannahs batted .428 with 101 hits and 76 runs en route to earning a place on the ABCA All-America Team. In 1988, he played collegiate summer baseball with the Yarmouth–Dennis Red Sox of the Cape Cod Baseball League and was named a league all-star. He was drafted by the Milwaukee Brewers in the 16th round of the 1989 MLB draft and played three seasons in the minors, reaching the class-AA El Paso Diablos.

Coaching and administrative career
After ending his playing career, Hannahs twice served as an assistant at Indiana State, from 1995–1999 and again in 2001, before accepted the head coaching position at Lincoln Trail College.  He served nine seasons in that capacity; claiming two Region 24 (NJCAA) titles and two Great Rivers Athletic Conference championships, accumulating a record of 108–96.  He added athletic director to his duties.  After the 2010 season, he was named President of Lincoln Trail College, and remained in that position until the summer of 2013, when he accepted the head coaching position at Indiana State

In August 2017 Hannahs signed a contract extension through the 2020 season.  On July 19, 2019, following a successful season and his 2nd NCAA Tourney berth; Hannahs inked a 2-year contract extension that will take him through the 2022 season.  A contract clause, enables a contract extension if he leads the Sycamores to a NCAA Tournament berth.  On May 31, 2021, the Sycamores were selected for their 11th NCAA Tournament.

Head coaching record
Hannahs's yearly NCAA Division I Head Coach records.

See also
List of current NCAA Division I baseball coaches

References

External links

Living people
1967 births
All-American college baseball players
Heads of universities and colleges in the United States
Baseball players from Ohio
Beloit Brewers players
El Paso Diablos players
Junior college athletic directors in the United States
Lincoln Trail Statesmen baseball coaches
Indiana State Sycamores baseball coaches
Indiana State Sycamores baseball players
Yarmouth–Dennis Red Sox players
People from Cambridge, Ohio